First United Methodist Church is a historic church located at 505 Main St., Paintsville, Kentucky, United States. In 1989, the church was added to the National Register of Historic Places.

The congregation was established in 1865. The congregation constructed a wood-frame building at the corner of Church St. and Main St. This building fulfilled the congregation's needs until 1914, when the current building was constructed at the same location.

The current building was originally constructed at a cost of a mere $16,000.  The most recent addition is a Family Life Center with gym and commercial kitchen and was completed in 2004 at a cost of approximately $1,200,000.00.  The church is growing and offers three primary worship services:  Sunday Morning 8:30 Traditional, Sunday Morning 10:45 Blended, and Sunday Evening "607" contemporary.

See also

National Register of Historic Places listings in Johnson County, Kentucky

References

External links
Paintsville First United Methodist Church
First United Methodist Church Facebook

National Register of Historic Places in Johnson County, Kentucky
Churches completed in 1914
20th-century Methodist church buildings in the United States
United Methodist churches in Kentucky
Churches in Johnson County, Kentucky
Churches on the National Register of Historic Places in Kentucky
1914 establishments in Kentucky
Gothic Revival church buildings in Kentucky
Paintsville, Kentucky